This article lists described species of the family Asilidae start with letter B.

A
B
C
D
E
F
G
H
I
J
K
L
M
N
O
P
Q
R
S
T
U
V
W
Y
Z

List of Species

Backomyia 
 Backomyia anomala (Wilcox & Martin, 1957)
 Backomyia hannai (Wilcox & Martin, 1957)
 Backomyia limpidipennis (Wilcox, 1936)
 Backomyia schlingeri (Wilcox & Martin, 1957)
 Backomyia seminoensis (Lavigne, 1971)

Bamwardaria 
 Bamwardaria josephi (Hradský, 1983)

Bana 
 Bana apicida (Londt, 1992)

Bathropsis 
 Bathropsis basalis (Curran, 1930)
 Bathropsis delgadoi (Kaletta, 1978)
 Bathropsis peruviana (Hermann, 1912)
 Bathropsis plazai (Kaletta, 1986)

Bathypogon 

 Bathypogon aoris (Walker, 1849)
 Bathypogon asiliformis (Loew, 1851)
 Bathypogon bidentatus (Hull, 1958)
 Bathypogon boebius (Walker, 1849)
 Bathypogon brachypterus (Macquart, 1838)
 Bathypogon calabyi (Hull, 1958)
 Bathypogon chionthrix (Hull, 1958)
 Bathypogon cinereus (Hull, 1959)
 Bathypogon danielsi (Lavigne, 2006)
 Bathypogon douglasi (Hull, 1958)
 Bathypogon flavifemoratus (Hull, 1958)
 Bathypogon fulvus (Hull, 1956)
 Bathypogon griseus (Hull, 1956)
 Bathypogon hamaturus (Hull, 1956)
 Bathypogon ichthyurus (Hull, 1958)
 Bathypogon macrodonturus (Hull, 1959)
 Bathypogon maculipes (Bigot, 1879)
 Bathypogon magnus (Hull, 1956)
 Bathypogon microdonturus (Hull, 1958)
 Bathypogon mutilatus (Walker, 1855)
 Bathypogon nigrinus (Ricardo, 1912)
 Bathypogon nigrochaetus (Hull, 1956)
 Bathypogon nigrotibiatus (Hull, 1958)
 Bathypogon ochraceus (Hull, 1959)
 Bathypogon ophiurus (Hull, 1958)
 Bathypogon pedanus (Walker, 1849)
 Bathypogon posticus (Walker, 1855)
 Bathypogon robustus (Hull, 1956)
 Bathypogon rubellus (Hull, 1956)
 Bathypogon rubidapex (Hull, 1956)
 Bathypogon rufitarsus (Hull, 1958)
 Bathypogon testaceovittatus (Macquart, 1855)
 Bathypogon tristis (White, 1914)
 Bathypogon uncinatus (Hull, 1956)

Beameromyia 
 Beameromyia bifida (Hardy, 1942)
 Beameromyia chrysops (Martin, 1957)
 Beameromyia dicrana (Scarbrough, 1997)
 Beameromyia disfascia (Martin, 1957)
 Beameromyia floridensis (Johnson, 1913)
 Beameromyia graminicola (Farr, 1963)
 Beameromyia incisuralis (Scarbrough & Perez-Gelabert)
 Beameromyia insulara (Martin, 1957)
 Beameromyia kawiensis (Martin, 1957)
 Beameromyia lacinia (Martin, 1957)
 Beameromyia lunula (Martin, 1957)
 Beameromyia macula (Martin, 1957)
 Beameromyia melana (Scarbrough, 1997)
 Beameromyia monticola (Martin, 1957)
 Beameromyia occidentis (Hardy, 1942)
 Beameromyia prairiensis (Martin, 1957)
 Beameromyia punicea (Martin, 1957)
 Beameromyia quaterna (Scarbrough, 1997)
 Beameromyia silvacola (Martin, 1957)
 Beameromyia virginensis (Scarbrough, 1997)
 Beameromyia vulgaris (Martin, 1957)

Blepharepium 
 Blepharepium auricinctum (Schiner, 1867)
 Blepharepium cajennensis (Fabricius, 1787)
 Blepharepium coarctatum (Perty, 1833)
 Blepharepium cunctabundum Papavero & Bernardi, 1973
 Blepharepium inca Curran, 1942
 Blepharepium luridum Rondani, 1848
 Blepharepium lynchi Carrera, 1949
 Blepharepium maculipennis (Macquart, 1855)
 Blepharepium priapus Papavero & Bernardi, 1973
 Blepharepium secabile (Walker, 1860)
 Blepharepium subcontractum (Walker, 1856)
 Blepharepium surumu Papavero & Bernardi, 1973
 Blepharepium sonorensis Papavero & Bernardi, 1973
 Blepharepium vorax Curran, 1942

Blepharotes 

 Blepharotes aterrimus (Hermann, 1907)
 Blepharotes coriarius (Wiedemann, 1830)
 Blepharotes rischbiethi (Lavigne & Young, 2009)
 Blepharotes vivax (Hermann, 1907)

Bohartia 
 Bohartia bromleyi (Hull, 1958)
 Bohartia isabella (Adisoemarto & Wood, 1975)
 Bohartia martini (Adisoemarto & Wood, 1975)
 Bohartia munda (Adisoemarto & Wood, 1975)
 Bohartia nitor (Adisoemarto & Wood, 1975)
 Bohartia senecta (Adisoemarto & Wood, 1975)
 Bohartia tenuis (Adisoemarto & Wood, 1975)

Borapisma 
 Borapisma chinai (Hull, 1957)

Brachyrhopala 
 Brachyrhopala aurimaculata (Clements, 2000)
 Brachyrhopala danielsi (Clements, 2000)
 Brachyrhopala flava (Clements, 2000)
 Brachyrhopala nigra (Clements, 2000)
 Brachyrhopala ochracea (Clements, 2000)
 Brachyrhopala quadrata (Clements, 2000)
 Brachyrhopala rubrithorax (Clements, 2000)
 Brachyrhopala scutellata (Clements, 2000)
 Brachyrhopala semirufa (Hardy, 1929)
 Brachyrhopala soluta (Walker, 1861)

Brevirostrum 
 Brevirostrum coei (Oldroyd, 1964)

Bromleyus 
 Bromleyus flavidorsus (Hardy, 1944)

Bromotheres 
 Bromotheres australis (Ricardo, 1913)
 Bromotheres culicivorus (White, 1918)

Broticosia 
 Broticosia calabyi (Paramonov, 1964)
 Broticosia calignea (Daniels, 1975)
 Broticosia paramonovi (Hull, 1962)
 Broticosia rapax (Hull, 1958)

Burmapogon 
 Burmapogon bruckschi (Dikow, 2014)

References 

 
Asilidae